Mikes, referred to as Toujours Mikes in the current logo, is a chain of restaurants that originated in Montreal, Quebec, Canada, with 70 restaurants in Eastern Canada, mostly in Quebec. 
The restaurant chain is owned by Imvescor Restaurant Group, based in Montreal, Quebec, which also owns Pizza Delight, Baton Rouge and Scores.

History
Mikes was founded in 1967 in Montreal, by the Marano brothers, as a sandwich shop. Since then, their menu has added pizza, pasta, other meals and some desserts. In 2016, in anticipation of its then upcoming 50th anniversary, the company debuted a new logo featuring a new slogan: "TOUJOURS MIKES" ("ALWAYS MIKES").

Gallery

See also
List of Canadian restaurant chains

References

External links

Restaurants established in 1967
Restaurants in Montreal
Restaurant chains in Canada
Pizza chains of Canada
1967 establishments in Quebec